Rafail Soilemezoglou (born 13 March 1996) is a Greek professional footballer who plays as a goalkeeper for Super League 2 club Karaiskakis.

References 

1996 births
Living people
Greek footballers
Greece youth international footballers
Super League Greece 2 players
PAOK FC players
A.E. Karaiskakis F.C. players
Association football goalkeepers